The National and Kapodistrian University of Athens (NKUA; , Ethnikó ke Kapodistriakó Panepistímio Athinón), usually referred to simply as the University of Athens (UoA), is a public university in Athens, Greece.

It has been in continuous operation since its establishment in 1837 and is the oldest higher education institution of the modern Greek state and the first contemporary university in both the Balkan Peninsula and the Eastern Mediterranean. Today it is one of the largest universities by enrollment in Europe, with over 69,000 registered students.

The National and Kapodistrian University of Athens is an integral part of the modern Greek academic and intellectual tradition.

History

Founding and expansion 

The University of Athens was founded on 3 May 1837 by King Otto of Greece (in Greek, Óthon) and was named in his honour Othonian University (Οθώνειον Πανεπιστήμιον). It was the first university in the liberated Greek state and in the surrounding area of Southeast Europe as well. It was also the second academic institution after the Ionian Academy. This fledgling university consisted of four faculties; Theology, Law, Medicine and Arts (which included applied sciences and mathematics). During its first year of operation, the institution was staffed by 33 professors, while courses were attended by 52 students and 75 non-matriculated "auditors".

It was first housed in the residence of architects Stamatios Kleanthis and Eduard Schaubert, on the north slope of the Acropolis, in Plaka, which now houses the museum of the university. In November 1841 the university relocated on the Central Building of the University of Athens, a building designed by Danish architect Christian Hansen. He followed a neoclassical approach, "combining the monument's magnificence with a human scale simplicity" and gave the building its H-shape.  The building was decorated by painter Carl Rahl, forming the famous "architectural trilogy of Athens", together with the building of the National Library of Greece (left of the university) and the building of the Athens Academy (right of the university). Construction began in 1839 in a location to the north of the Acropolis. Its front wing, also known as the Propylaea, was completed in 1842–1843. The rest of the wings' construction, that was supervised at first by Greek architect Lysandros Kaftantzoglou and later by his colleague Anastasios Theofilas, was completed in 1864. The building is nowadays part of what is called the "Athenian Neoclassical Trilogy".

The Othonian University was renamed to National University (Εθνικόν Πανεπιστήμιον) in 1862, following events that forced King Otto to leave the country. 

A major change in the structure of the university came about in 1904, when the faculty of Arts was divided into two separate faculties: that of Arts (Σχολή Τεχνών) and that of Sciences (Σχολή Επιστημών), the latter consisting of the departments of Physics and Mathematics and the School of Pharmacy. In 1919, a department of chemistry was added, and in 1922 the School of Pharmacy was renamed a department. A further change came about when the School of Dentistry was added to the faculty of medicine.

Between 1895 and 1911, an average of 1,000 new students matriculated each year, a number which increased to 2,000 at the end of World War I. This resulted in the decision to introduce entrance examinations for all the faculties, beginning for the academic year 1927–28. Since 1954 the number of students admitted each year has been fixed by the Ministry of Education and Religion, by proposal of the faculties.

Modern history 
The University Club building was founded in 1930. Today the building houses the Health Services Office, the Meals Department, the University Club reading rooms, and the Students Cultural Association (POFPA).

From 1911 until 1932 the university was separated into the Kapodistrian University (the humanities departments; named after Ioannis Kapodistrias, the first head of state of the independent modern Greek state) and the National University (the science departments). In 1932, the two separate legal entities were merged into the "National and Kapodistrian University of Athens."

During the 1960s construction work began on the University Campus in the suburb of Ilissia, which houses the Schools of Philosophy, Theology and Sciences.

In 2013, the University Senate made the decision to suspend all operations in the wake of the Ministry of Education and Religious Affairs cutting 1,655 administrative jobs from universities around the country. In a statement, the University Senate said that "any educational, research and administrative operation of the University of Athens is objectively impossible".

Faculties and departments 

The University of Athens is divided into schools, faculties and departments as follows. The naming is nοt consistent in English for historical reasons, but in Greek the largest divisions are generally named "σχολές" (schools) and are divided in "τμήματα" (departments), furthermore subdivided in "τομείς" (faculties).

The University of Athens also offers an English-taught 4-year undergraduate programme (with tuition) in Archaeology, History, and Literature of Ancient Greece.

Academic evaluation

In 2015, the external evaluation of the institution cited University of Athens as Worthy of merit.

An external evaluation of all academic departments in Greek universities was conducted by the Hellenic Quality Assurance and Accreditation Agency (HQA) in 2010–14.

Rankings 

The University of Athens is considered one of the leading universities of Greece, a leading European regional university and is present in the top universities annual lists. The most recent is the Webometrics  Ranking of World Universities of 2019 that listed it in the 219th place out of 12,000 universities worldwide (1st in Greece, 70th in Europe) with very high perspectives regarding the university's openness.

It is ranked 401st–500th in The Times Higher Education (THE) annual list.

Furthermore, according to the QS World University Rankings annual list it is listed 651st–700th with very high research output. The Shanghai Ranking (Academic Ranking of World Universities) ranked in 2018 the University 301st–400th globally. In 2018 it was listed by the CWTS Leiden Ranking in the 232nd place globally with great publication output in the Biomedical and Health Sciences field.

In 2019 the university was situated in the 73rd place worldwide in the Webometrics Ranking of World Universities by citations in Top Google Scholar Profiles. The U.S. News & World Report Best Colleges Ranking (USNWR) lists it 279th in the world and 1st in Greece.

In the field of Pharmacy and Pharmacology it is listed 101st–150th in the world by QS and 94th by USNWR. The last situates the University 114th in Immunology and 166th in Clinical Medicine.

Campuses 

The main campus is at Ano Ilisia, Zografou. There the faculties of Science, Theology and Philosophy are situated. The faculty of Life Sciences is located at Goudi and the faculty of Physical Education and Sports Science is located at Dafni. The faculties of Media, Education, Economics, Law and Public Administration are housed in various buildings near the centre of Athens, along with various administration facilities. University administration was housed initially in a historical neoclassical building near the center of Athens on Panepistimiou Street, but was relocated at the main university campus later.

{| class="wikitable"
|-
! Campus location|| Schools || Departments
|-
| rowspan ="4" | Ano Ilisia || School of Theology
|-
| School of Philosophy || 
|-
| School of Science ||
|-
| || Department of Pharmacy (School of Health Sciences)
|-
| Goudi || School of Health Sciences ||
|-
| rowspan ="3" | Centre of Athens || School of Law
|-
| School of Economics and Political Sciences
|-
| School of Education (Primary and Early Childhood)
|-
| Dafni || School of Physical Education and Sport Science
|-
| rowspan ="5" | Psachna || School of Agricultural Development, Nutrition and Sustainability
|-
| || Department of Aerospace Science and Technology (School of Science)
|-
| || Department of Digital Industry Technologies (School of Science)
|-
| || Department of Digital Art and Cinema (School of Economics and Political Sciences)
|-
| || Department of Ports Management and Shipping (School of Economics and Political Sciences)
|}

Research 
Research in the University of Athens includes almost all research interests. Such research in the university is associated with that conducted by the hospitals and research institutes of the metropolitan area, including the National Research Center for Physical Sciences "Demokritos", the National Hellenic Research Foundation (EIE), the National Observatory of Athens, the Hellenic Pasteur Institute, the Biomedical Sciences Research Center (BSRC) "Alexander Fleming", the Athens High Performance Computing Laboratory, the National Centre for Marine Research (NCMR) and the Foundation for Biomedical Research of the Academy of Athens (BRFAA).

Research conducted in the institutes of the metropolitan area of Athens accounted for more than 50% of the ISI-indexed scientific publications coming from Greece. The Department of Informatics and Telecommunications has been ranked continuously among the 100 most important research institutes in the field of Computer Science, according to the Academic Ranking of World Universities (ARWU).

KEDIVIM   
The Centre of Continuing Education and Lifelong Learning (KEDIVIM;) of the University of Athens (UoA) is a separate continuing and professional adult educational unit within University of Athens, at "non-typical education", although it is fully or partially regulated by the state and lead to officially recognised qualifications being considered non-formal education (NFE). It offers short-term courses on-campus and by Distance e-Learning Mode off-campus mediated via real-time electronic means, certified by the EOPPEP - National Organization for the Certification of Qualifications and Vocational Guidance. In Greece, adult education, continuing education or lifelong learning is offered to students of all adult ages.

Notable alumni 

Throughout its history, a sizeable number of University of Athens alumni have become notable in many varied fields, both academic and otherwise. Moreover, two Nobel Prize-winners have studied or taught at Athens, with both their prizes being in Literature.

Politics

Fifteen Greek prime ministers and three Greek presidents (Konstantinos Karamanlis served as both) have studied at the University of Athens, including Charilaos Trikoupis, Eleftherios Venizelos, Georgios Papandreou, Andreas Papandreou, Konstantinos Karamanlis, Karolos Papoulias, and most recently interim prime minister Vassiliki Thanou-Christophilou. Also, Constantine II, the last monarch of Greece, and Nicos Anastasiades, the current president of Cyprus, attended the university.

The University of Athens has also been home to a large number of other politicians, such as Dora Bakoyannis, Kyriakos Mavronikolas, Georgios Alogoskoufis, Fofi Gennimata, and Dimitris Koutsoumpas.

Science
 Gerasimos Danilatos, physicist, inventor of the ESEM
 Sophia Frangou, psychiatrist
 John P. A. Ioannidis (DSc, 1996 and MD 1990), professor and medical researcher
 Fotis Kafatos, biologist
 Michael N. Katehakis, applied mathematics and operations research
 Nikos Logothetis, neuroscientist
 George Michalopoulos, professor and medical researcher
 Dimitri Nanopoulos, physicist
Georgios Papanikolaou, doctor, inventor of the Pap test
 Costas Soukoulis, physicist
 Nikos Sypsas, medical doctor and infectious disease expert
 Dimitrios Trichopoulos, cancer epidemiologist
 Panayotis Varotsos, physicist
 Leonidas Zervas, organic chemist
 Zoe Pikramenou, inorganic chemist

Literature and philosophy
 Giorgios Seferis, Nobel laureate (1963), poet
 Odysseas Elytis, Nobel laureate (1979), poet
Nikos Kazantzakis, writer and philosopher, nine times Nobel nominee
Helene Ahrweiler, byzantinologist
Cornelius Castoriadis, philosopher
 Dimitra Fimi, academic and writer
 Emmanuel Kriaras, lexicographer and philologist
 Vassilis Rotas, author, translator and politician

 Stathis Psillos, philosopher of science, https://en.wikipedia.org/wiki/Stathis_Psillos

Archaeology
 Stylianos Alexiou, archaeologist and philologist
 Semni Karouzou, archaeologist and curator
Yannis Sakellarakis, archaeologist
Evi Touloupa, archaeologist and curator

Religion
 Saint Nectarios of Aegina
 Ieronymos I of Athens, Archbishop of Athens and All Greece
 Anastasios of Albania, Archbishop of Albania
 Porfirije, Archbishop of Peć, Metropolitan of Belgrade and Karlovci, and Serbian Patriarch
 Demetrios Trakatellis, Archbishop of America

Other
Christos Christou, International President of Médecins Sans Frontières
Apostolos Santas, Greek veteran of the Resistance against the Axis Occupation of Greece during World War II
 Panagiotis Pikrammenos, judge and caretaker prime minister

See also 
 Athens University Museum
 Education in Greece
 List of modern universities in Europe (1801–1945)
 List of research institutes in Greece
 List of universities in Greece
 List of University of Athens alumni
 Open access in Greece

References

External links 
 
 National and Kapodistrian University of Athens – Official website 
 Hellenic Quality Assurance and Accreditation Agency (HQA) 
 Kallipos (e-books Greek academic publishing) 
 Greek Research and Technology Network (GRNET) 
 National and Kapodistrian University of Athens Internal Quality Assurance Unit 
 Didaskaleio of NKUA University (Διδασκαλείο Ξένων Γλωσσών) 

 
Athens
Education in Athens
Athens University
Public universities
1837 establishments in Greece
Ioannis Kapodistrias